Boudreau is a surname of French origin. The name may refer to:
Persons
Abbie Boudreau (b. 1978), American investigative journalist on CNN
Bernie Boudreau (b. 1944), Canadian lawyer and politician from Nova Scotia
Bruce Boudreau (b. 1955), Canadian professional ice hockey coach
Claire Boudreau (1965–2020), Canadian historian, genealogist, and officer of arms
Jean Boudreau (1748–1827), political figure in Lower Canada
Jim Boudreau, Canadian politician from Nova Scotia
Léone Boudreau-Nelson (1915-2004), American-born Canadian phonetician
Lou Boudreau (1917–2001), American professional Hall of Fame baseball player
Lucien Boudreau (1874–1962), Canadian politician from Alberta
Robert Boudreau (b. 1927), American conductor.
Rodolphe Boudreau (1865–1923), Canadian civil servant from Quebec, Clerk of the Privy Council 1907–23
Roy Boudreau (b. 1946), Canadian teacher and politician from New Brunswick
Tess Boudreau (1919–2007), Canadian photographer
Victor Boudreau (b. 1970), Canadian politician from New Brunswick
Walter Boudreau (b. 1947), Québécois composer, saxophonist, and conductor